23rd March 1931: Shaheed is a 2002 Indian Hindi-language historical  biographical film about Bhagat Singh, directed by Guddu Dhanoa which depicts the events leading up to the hanging of Singh and his companions Shivaram Rajguru and Sukhdev Thapar on 23 March 1931. The film stars Bobby Deol as Singh, his elder brother Sunny Deol as Chandra Shekhar Azad and Amrita Singh in her comeback role as Vidyavati Kaur (Singh's mother).

The film's release coincided with another film based on Bhagat Singh directed by Rajkumar Santoshi and titled The Legend of Bhagat Singh. Both films failed at the box office. But both the films gained a cult status.

Plot
Set in the mid-1920s, British India, the film tells the story of freedom fighters Bhagat Singh and Chandrashekhar Azad who have only one motive in mind: Freedom for India. They set about doing this task together with two other men, Sukhdev and Rajguru. Bhagat Singh is enraged when his mentor Lala Lajpat Rai is mercilessly beaten to death by the police, and he sets about to avenge his death. He and his colleagues do succeed in killing one of the officials responsible, but they are identified, and as a result, Bhagat and Rajguru are arrested and held in prison, where they are tortured relentlessly.

When produced in court, they dramatically admit to the killing and claim that it was done in the name of "freedom". The judge and the public prosecutor do not see it their way, and they are sentenced to life in prison. Bhagat's mother, Vidya, comes to meet him in prison, and he goes to greet her, shackled in chains from head to toe, and he foretells that India will continue to suffer, even after independence from the British, and that he will return in another birth to free his motherland. Subsequently, all three are charged with treason and assassination and are sentenced to death.

Cast
Bobby Deol as Bhagat Singh
Sunny Deol as Chandra Shekhar Azad
Amrita Singh as Vidyavati Kaur Sandhu, Bhagat's mother
Ranjan Koshal as Kishan Singh Sandhu, Bhagat's father
Rahul Dev as Sukhdev Thapar
Vicky Ahuja as Shivram Hari Rajguru
Vivek Shauq as Bhagwati Charan Vohra
Aishwariya Rai as Mannewali (special appearance)
Divya Dutta as Durgawati Devi a.k.a. "Durga Bhabhi"
Sachin Khedekar as Advocate Asaf Ali
Vivek Kumar Rawat as Batukeshwar Dutt
Suresh Oberoi as Jailor Chadda
Shakti Kapoor as Chattar Singh
Raja Bundela as Lala Lajpat Rai
Akshay Anand as Ram Prasad Bismil
Suresh Chatwal as Kishori Lal
Imran Khan as Kartar Singh Sarabha
Deepak Sharma as Jatindra Nath Das a.k.a. "Jatin Das"
Sanjay Tripathi as Hans Raj Vohra
Raman Khatri as Ashfaqulla Khan
Rana Jung Bahadur as Lawyer
Tej Sapru as Dilbagh Singh
Indal Singh as Jai Gopal
Samaresh Routray as Yashpal
Rajesh Khera as Sardar Ajeet Singh, Bhagat's uncle
Manoj Tiwari as Veer Bhadra Tiwari

Soundtrack

References

External links 
 

2002 films
Films about Bhagat Singh
Films set in 1931
Indian historical action films
2000s Hindi-language films
Films scored by Anand Raj Anand
Vijayta Films films
Films scored by Surinder Sodhi
Films set in the British Raj
Films set in Lahore
2000s historical films